Ostorhinchus parvulus, also known as the redspot cardinalfish, is a marine fish in the family Apogonidae.

Description 
Redspot cardinalfish are semi-transparent with a large pink caudal spot.

Distribution and habitat 

Reproduction 
Redspot cardinalfish are mouthbreeders that form distinct spawning pairs.

References

External links
 

parvulus
Fish described in 1912